Verkhny Urtuy is a rural locality (a selo) in Verkhneurtuysky Selsoviet of Konstantinovsky District, Amur Oblast, Russia. The population was 421 as of 2018. There are 6 streets.

Geography 
Verkhny Urtuy is located 29 km north of Konstantinovka (the district's administrative centre) by road. Novotroitskoye is the nearest rural locality.

References 

Rural localities in Konstantinovsky District